The Love Revolution Tour is the sixth headlining tour by English recording artist, Will Young. The tour supports his sixth studio album, 85% Proof. Beginning in October 2015, the singer will primarily perform within theatres throughout United Kingdom and Ireland.

Background
The tour was announced in June 2015, a week after the album's release. It is Young's first tour in three years. After his 2011 tour, Young went on to star in a traveling production of the famed musical, Cabaret. Additionally, he released his autobiography, Funny Peculiar. He wrote political blogs for The Huffington Post and became mentor for up and coming musicians.

Opening act
Lemar

Setlist
This setlist was obtained from the 11 November 2015 concert, at the Newcastle City Hall in Newcastle, England. It does not represent all concerts during the tour.
"Brave Man"
"U Think I’m Sexy"
"Runaway"
"Light My Fire"
"Thank You"
"Grace"
"Switch It On"
"You and I"
"Gold"
"Like a River"
"Changes"
"Your Game"
"Who Am I"
"Jealousy"
Encore
"Love Revolution"
"Joy"
"Leave Right Now"

Tour dates

Box office score data

External links
Will Young's Official Website

References

2015 concert tours